The 2021–22 season is the 77th season in the existence of 1. FC Slovácko and the club's 28th consecutive season in the top flight of Czech football. In addition to the domestic league, 1. FC Slovácko are participating in this season's edition of the Czech Cup.

Players

First-team squad

Transfers

Pre-season and friendlies

Competitions

Overall record

Czech First League

League table

Results summary

Results by round

Matches

Czech Cup

References

1. FC Slovácko seasons
Slovacko